Paul-Léon Seitz (22 December 1906 - 23 February 1984) was a French bishop in the Catholic Church.  He was ordained as a bishop in 1952 and named as the titular bishop of the church's Catula titular see.  From 1960 to 1975, he served as the Bishop of Kontum, a Central Highlands region of Viêt Nam known for its Montagnard tribes.
  
Seitz was dedicated to medical and social welfare for the Montagnaard people.  He was active in fundraising efforts on behalf of the tribespeople, securing donations from England and the United States.

During the Vietnam War, Seitz sought relief for the many thousands of refugees that were displaced by the Viet Cong.

References
 Cheney, David M. "The Hierarchy of the Catholic Church"
 Hickey, Gerald Cannon. (2003). Window on a War: An Anthropologist in the Vietnam Conflict, Lubbock, Texas: Texas Tech University Press
 Seitz, Paul L. (1975). Men of Dignity: The Montagnards of South Vietnam, Bar-le-Duc, France: Imprimerie Saint-Paul

1906 births
1984 deaths
20th-century Roman Catholic bishops in Vietnam
Participants in the Second Vatican Council
French Roman Catholic bishops in Asia
Kon Tum province
People of the Vietnam War